The Dillard Mill State Historic Site is a privately owned, state-administered property on Huzzah Creek in Crawford County, Missouri, that preserves a water-powered gristmill. The  site has been operated as a state historic site by the Missouri Department of Natural Resources under a lease agreement with the L-A-D Foundation since 1975. The site was listed on the National Register of Historic Places in 2015.

History
A mill was built on Huzzah Creek in 1853 by Francis Wisdom and it was known as the Wisdom Mill. It was destroyed by fire in 1895. The property changed hands, and a new mill, the Mische Mill, was built in 1908. The Mische Mill used an underwater turbine rather than the old waterwheel, and the owners altered the course of the stream and the bluff at the site. The mill was in operation until 1956. It was renamed the Dillard Mill in 1975 when the state took over management of the property. It was dedicated as a historic site in 1977. Restoration of the mill was completed in 1980.

See also
National Register of Historic Places listings in Crawford County, Missouri

References

External links

Dillard Mill State Historic Site Missouri Department of Natural Resources
Dillard Mill State Historic Site Map Missouri Department of Natural Resources

Grinding mills in Missouri
Protected areas established in 1977
Museums in Crawford County, Missouri
Mill museums in Missouri
Missouri State Historic Sites
Protected areas of Crawford County, Missouri
Historic districts on the National Register of Historic Places in Missouri
Grinding mills on the National Register of Historic Places in Missouri
National Register of Historic Places in Crawford County, Missouri